John Joseph McDonald (25 March 1904 – 24 February 1959) was Labor Party Member of the Tasmania House of Assembly for the electorate of Bass from 9 June 1934 until his resignation on 16 April 1945. He was the son of James McDonald and the brother of Thomas Raymond McDonald, both also members of the Tasmanian Parliament.

From 1940 to 1943, during World War II, McDonald served in the Australian Army with the  1st Motor Brigade, and was discharged with the rank of lieutenant.

McDonald, then a bookmaker, was sentenced to ten years imprisonment in 1951 for the manslaughter in Burnie of his then de facto wife Marjorie Holgate (also known as Marjorie McDonald). John McDonald was released in April 1956, and then served as a public service clerk in the Public Works Department at Poatina until his death.

References

Further reading 
 

1904 births
1959 deaths
Members of the Tasmanian House of Assembly
Australian Army officers
Australian military personnel of World War II
Australian bookmakers
Australian people convicted of manslaughter
Australian Labor Party members of the Parliament of Tasmania
20th-century Australian politicians